The Yusan Hall is private mansion in Yongjing Township, Changhua County, Taiwan.

History
The building was built during the reign of Tongzhi Emperor in 1884 by Chen Yu-kuang, the 15th generation of the Chen family. The mansion was constructed in 7.5 years.

Architecture
The main structure has been well preserved in its original Qing Dynasty architecture.

Transportation
The building is accessible south west of Yongjing Station of Taiwan Railways.

See also
 List of tourist attractions in Taiwan

References

1884 establishments in Taiwan
Buildings and structures in Changhua County
Houses completed in 1884
Houses in Taiwan
Tourist attractions in Changhua County